Fire is the rapid oxidation of a material (the fuel) in the exothermic chemical process of combustion, releasing heat, light, and various reaction products.
At a certain point in the combustion reaction, called the ignition point, flames are produced. The flame is the visible portion of the fire. Flames consist primarily of carbon dioxide, water vapor, oxygen and nitrogen. If hot enough, the gases may become ionized to produce plasma. Depending on the substances alight, and any impurities outside, the color of the flame and the fire's intensity will be different.

Fire in its most common form can result in conflagration, which has the potential to cause physical damage through burning. Fire is an important process that affects ecological systems around the globe. The positive effects of fire include stimulating growth and maintaining various ecological systems.
Its negative effects include hazard to life and property, atmospheric pollution, and water contamination. If fire removes protective vegetation, heavy rainfall may lead to an increase in soil erosion by water. Also, when vegetation is burned, the nitrogen it contains is released into the atmosphere, unlike elements such as potassium and phosphorus which remain in the ash and are quickly recycled into the soil. This loss of nitrogen caused by a fire produces a long-term reduction in the fertility of the soil, which can be recovered as atmospheric nitrogen is fixed and converted to ammonia by natural phenomena such as lightning or by leguminous plants such as clover, peas, and green beans.

Fire is one of the four classical elements and has been used by humans in rituals, in agriculture for clearing land, for cooking, generating heat and light, for signaling, propulsion purposes, smelting, forging, incineration of waste, cremation, and as a weapon or mode of destruction.

Physical properties

Chemistry 

Fire is a chemical process in which a fuel and an oxidizing agent react, yielding carbon dioxide and water. This process, known as a combustion reaction, does not proceed directly and involves intermediates. Although the oxidizing agent is typically oxygen, other compounds are able to fulfill the role. For instance, chlorine trifluoride is able to ignite sand.

Fires start when a flammable or a combustible material, in combination with a sufficient quantity of an oxidizer such as oxygen gas or another oxygen-rich compound (though non-oxygen oxidizers exist), is exposed to a source of heat or ambient temperature above the flash point for the fuel/oxidizer mix, and is able to sustain a rate of rapid oxidation that produces a chain reaction. This is commonly called the fire tetrahedron. Fire cannot exist without all of these elements in place and in the right proportions. For example, a flammable liquid will start burning only if the fuel and oxygen are in the right proportions. Some fuel-oxygen mixes may require a catalyst, a substance that is not consumed, when added, in any chemical reaction during combustion, but which enables the reactants to combust more readily.

Once ignited, a chain reaction must take place whereby fires can sustain their own heat by the further release of heat energy in the process of combustion and may propagate, provided there is a continuous supply of an oxidizer and fuel.

If the oxidizer is oxygen from the surrounding air, the presence of a force of gravity, or of some similar force caused by acceleration, is necessary to produce convection, which removes combustion products and brings a supply of oxygen to the fire. Without gravity, a fire rapidly surrounds itself with its own combustion products and non-oxidizing gases from the air, which exclude oxygen and extinguish the fire. Because of this, the risk of fire in a spacecraft is small when it is coasting in inertial flight. This does not apply if oxygen is supplied to the fire by some process other than thermal convection.

Fire can be extinguished by removing any one of the elements of the fire tetrahedron. Consider a natural gas flame, such as from a stove-top burner. The fire can be extinguished by any of the following:
 turning off the gas supply, which removes the fuel source;
 covering the flame completely, which smothers the flame as the combustion both uses the available oxidizer (the oxygen in the air) and displaces it from the area around the flame with CO2;
 application of an inert gas such as carbon dioxide, smothering the flame by displacing the available oxidizer;
 application of water, which removes heat from the fire faster than the fire can produce it (similarly, blowing hard on a flame will displace the heat of the currently burning gas from its fuel source, to the same end); or
 application of a retardant chemical such as Halon (largely banned in some countries ) to the flame, which retards the chemical reaction itself until the rate of combustion is too slow to maintain the chain reaction.

In contrast, fire is intensified by increasing the overall rate of combustion. Methods to do this include balancing the input of fuel and oxidizer to stoichiometric proportions, increasing fuel and oxidizer input in this balanced mix, increasing the ambient temperature so the fire's own heat is better able to sustain combustion, or providing a catalyst, a non-reactant medium in which the fuel and oxidizer can more readily react.

Flame 

A flame is a mixture of reacting gases and solids emitting visible, infrared, and sometimes ultraviolet light, the frequency spectrum of which depends on the chemical composition of the burning material and intermediate reaction products. In many cases, such as the burning of organic matter, for example wood, or the incomplete combustion of gas, incandescent solid particles called soot produce the familiar red-orange glow of "fire". This light has a continuous spectrum. Complete combustion of gas has a dim blue color due to the emission of single-wavelength radiation from various electron transitions in the excited molecules formed in the flame. Usually oxygen is involved, but hydrogen burning in chlorine also produces a flame, producing hydrogen chloride (HCl). Other possible combinations producing flames, amongst many, are fluorine and hydrogen, and hydrazine and nitrogen tetroxide. Hydrogen and hydrazine/UDMH flames are similarly pale blue, while burning boron and its compounds, evaluated in mid-20th century as a high energy fuel for jet and rocket engines, emits intense green flame, leading to its informal nickname of "Green Dragon".

The glow of a flame is complex. Black-body radiation is emitted from soot, gas, and fuel particles, though the soot particles are too small to behave like perfect blackbodies. There is also photon emission by de-excited atoms and molecules in the gases. Much of the radiation is emitted in the visible and infrared bands. The color depends on temperature for the black-body radiation, and on chemical makeup for the emission spectra. The dominant color in a flame changes with temperature. The photo of the forest fire in Canada is an excellent example of this variation. Near the ground, where most burning is occurring, the fire is white, the hottest color possible for organic material in general, or yellow. Above the yellow region, the color changes to orange, which is cooler, then red, which is cooler still. Above the red region, combustion no longer occurs, and the uncombusted carbon particles are visible as black smoke.

The common distribution of a flame under normal gravity conditions depends on convection, as soot tends to rise to the top of a general flame, as in a candle in normal gravity conditions, making it yellow. In micro gravity or zero gravity, such as an environment in outer space, convection no longer occurs, and the flame becomes spherical, with a tendency to become more blue and more efficient (although it may go out if not moved steadily, as the CO2 from combustion does not disperse as readily in micro gravity, and tends to smother the flame). There are several possible explanations for this difference, of which the most likely is that the temperature is sufficiently evenly distributed that soot is not formed and complete combustion occurs. Experiments by NASA reveal that diffusion flames in micro gravity allow more soot to be completely oxidized after they are produced than diffusion flames on Earth, because of a series of mechanisms that behave differently in micro gravity when compared to normal gravity conditions. These discoveries have potential applications in applied science and industry, especially concerning fuel efficiency.

In combustion engines, various steps are taken to eliminate a flame. The method depends mainly on whether the fuel is oil, wood, or a high-energy fuel such as jet fuel.

Typical adiabatic temperatures 

The adiabatic flame temperature of a given fuel and oxidizer pair is that at which the gases achieve stable combustion.
 Oxy–dicyanoacetylene 
 Oxy–acetylene 
 Oxyhydrogen 
 Air–acetylene 
 Blowtorch (air–MAPP gas) 
 Bunsen burner (air–natural gas) 
 Candle (air–paraffin)

Fire science & ecology 

Every natural ecosystem on land has its own fire regime, and the organisms in those ecosystems are adapted to or dependent upon that fire regime. Fire creates a mosaic of different habitat patches, each at a different stage of succession. Different species of plants, animals, and microbes specialize in exploiting a particular stage, and by creating these different types of patches, fire allows a greater number of species to exist within a landscape.

Fire science is a branch of physical science which includes fire behavior, dynamics, and combustion. Applications of fire science include fire protection, fire investigation, and wildfire management.

Fossil record

Human control

Early human control

The ability to control fire was a dramatic change in the habits of early humans. Making fire to generate heat and light made it possible for people to cook food, simultaneously increasing the variety and availability of nutrients and reducing disease by killing organisms in the food. The heat produced would also help people stay warm in cold weather, enabling them to live in cooler climates. Fire also kept nocturnal predators at bay. Although this evidence shows that fire may have been used in a controlled fashion about 1 million years ago, other sources put the date of regular use at 400,000 years ago. Evidence becomes widespread around 50 to 100 thousand years ago, suggesting regular use from this time; interestingly, resistance to air pollution started to evolve in human populations at a similar point in time. The use of fire became progressively more sophisticated, as it was used to create charcoal and to control wildlife from 'tens of thousands' of years ago.

Fire has also been used for centuries as a method of torture and execution, as evidenced by death by burning as well as torture devices such as the iron boot, which could be filled with water, oil, or even lead and then heated over an open fire to the agony of the wearer.

By the Neolithic Revolution, during the introduction of grain-based agriculture, people all over the world used fire as a tool in landscape management. These fires were typically controlled burns or "cool fires", as opposed to uncontrolled "hot fires", which damage the soil. Hot fires destroy plants and animals, and endanger communities. This is especially a problem in the forests of today where traditional burning is prevented in order to encourage the growth of timber crops. Cool fires are generally conducted in the spring and autumn. They clear undergrowth, burning up biomass that could trigger a hot fire should it get too dense. They provide a greater variety of environments, which encourages game and plant diversity. For humans, they make dense, impassable forests traversable. Another human use for fire in regards to landscape management is its use to clear land for agriculture. Slash-and-burn agriculture is still common across much of tropical Africa, Asia and South America. "For small farmers, it is a convenient way to clear overgrown areas and release nutrients from standing vegetation back into the soil", said Miguel Pinedo-Vasquez, an ecologist at the Earth Institute’s Center for Environmental Research and Conservation. However, this useful strategy is also problematic. Growing population, fragmentation of forests and warming climate are making the earth's surface more prone to ever-larger escaped fires. These harm ecosystems and human infrastructure, cause health problems, and send up spirals of carbon and soot that may encourage even more warming of the atmosphere – and thus feed back into more fires. Globally today, as much as 5 million square kilometres – an area more than half the size of the United States – burns in a given year.

Later human control 

There are numerous modern applications of fire. In its broadest sense, fire is used by nearly every human being on earth in a controlled setting every day. Users of internal combustion vehicles employ fire every time they drive. Thermal power stations provide electricity for a large percentage of humanity by igniting fuels such as coal, oil or natural gas, then using the resultant heat to boil water into steam, which then drives turbines.

Use of fire in war 

The use of fire in warfare has a long history. Fire was the basis of all early thermal weapons. Homer detailed the use of fire by Greek soldiers who hid in a wooden horse to burn Troy during the Trojan war. Later the Byzantine fleet used Greek fire to attack ships and men. 

The invention of gunpowder in China led to the fire lance, a flame-thrower weapon dating to around 1000 CE which was a precursor to projectile weapons driven by burning gunpowder.

In the First World War, the earliest modern flamethrowers were used by infantry, and were successfully mounted on armoured vehicles in the Second World War. Hand-thrown incendiary bombs improvised from glass bottles, later known as Molotov cocktails, were deployed during the Spanish Civil War in the 1930s, which also saw the deployment of incendiary bombs against  Guernica by Fascist Italian and Nazi German air forces that had been created specifically to support Franco's Nationalists.

Incendiary bombs were dropped by Axis and Allies during the Second World War, notably on Coventry, Tokyo, Rotterdam, London, Hamburg and Dresden; in the latter two cases firestorms were deliberately caused in which a ring of fire surrounding each city was drawn inward by an updraft caused by a central cluster of fires. The United States Army Air Force also extensively used incendiaries against Japanese targets in the latter months of the war, devastating entire cities constructed primarily of wood and paper houses. The incendiary fluid napalm was used in July 1944, towards the end of the Second World War, although its use did not gain public attention until the Vietnam War.

Productive use for energy 

Burning fuel converts chemical energy into heat energy; wood has been used as fuel since prehistory.   The International Energy Agency states that nearly 80% of the world's power has consistently come from fossil fuels such as petroleum, natural gas, and coal in the past decades. The fire in a power station is used to heat water, creating steam that drives turbines. The turbines then spin an electric generator to produce electricity. Fire is also used to provide mechanical work directly by thermal expansion, in both external and internal combustion engines.

The unburnable solid remains of a combustible material left after a fire is called clinker if its melting point is below the flame temperature, so that it fuses and then solidifies as it cools, and ash if its melting point is above the flame temperature.

Fire management
Controlling a fire to optimize its size, shape, and intensity is generally called fire management, and the more advanced forms of it, as traditionally (and sometimes still) practiced by skilled cooks, blacksmiths, ironmasters, and others, are highly skilled activities. They include knowledge of which fuel to burn; how to arrange the fuel; how to stoke the fire both in early phases and in maintenance phases; how to modulate the heat, flame, and smoke as suited to the desired application; how best to bank a fire to be revived later; how to choose, design, or modify stoves, fireplaces, bakery ovens, industrial furnaces; and so on. Detailed expositions of fire management are available in various books about blacksmithing, about skilled camping or military scouting, and about domestic arts.

Protection and prevention

Wildfire prevention programs around the world may employ techniques such as wildland fire use and prescribed or controlled burns. Wildland fire use refers to any fire of natural causes that is monitored but allowed to burn. Controlled burns are fires ignited by government agencies under less dangerous weather conditions.

Fire fighting services are provided in most developed areas to extinguish or contain uncontrolled fires. Trained firefighters use fire apparatus, water supply resources such as water mains and fire hydrants or they might use A and B class foam depending on what is feeding the fire.

Fire prevention is intended to reduce sources of ignition. Fire prevention also includes education to teach people how to avoid causing fires. Buildings, especially schools and tall buildings, often conduct fire drills to inform and prepare citizens on how to react to a building fire. Purposely starting destructive fires constitutes arson and is a crime in most jurisdictions.

Model building codes require passive fire protection and active fire protection systems to minimize damage resulting from a fire. The most common form of active fire protection is fire sprinklers. To maximize passive fire protection of buildings, building materials and furnishings in most developed countries are tested for fire-resistance, combustibility and flammability. Upholstery, carpeting and plastics used in vehicles and vessels are also tested.

Where fire prevention and fire protection have failed to prevent damage, fire insurance can mitigate the financial impact.

See also 

 Aodh (given name)
 Bonfire
 The Chemical History of a Candle
 Colored fire
 Control of fire by early humans
 Deflagration
 Fire (classical element)
 Fire investigation
 Fire lookout
 Fire lookout tower
 Fire making
 Fire pit
 Fire safety
 Fire triangle
 Fire whirl
 Fire worship
 Flame test
 Life Safety Code
 List of fires
 List of light sources
 Phlogiston theory
 Piano burning
 Prometheus, the Greek mythological figure who gave mankind fire
 Pyrokinesis
 Pyrolysis
 Pyromania
 Self-immolation

References

Notes

Citations

Sources 
 Haung, Kai (2009). Population and Building Factors That Impact Residential Fire Rates in Large U.S. Cities. Applied Research Project. Texas State University.
 
 Kosman, Admiel (January 13, 2011). "Sacred fire". Haaretz.

External links 

 How Fire Works at HowStuffWorks
 What exactly is fire? from The Straight Dope
 On Fire, an Adobe Flash–based science tutorial from the NOVA (TV series)
 "20 Things You Didn't Know About... Fire" from Discover magazine

 
Articles containing video clips
Cooking techniques